Anna Maria Tatò (19 April 1940 – 3 June 2022) was an Italian film director. She directed six films between 1978 and 1997. Her film Marcello Mastroianni: mi ricordo, sì, io mi ricordo was screened in the Un Certain Regard section at the 1997 Cannes Film Festival.

Filmography
 Le serpentine d'oro (1978)
 Doppio sogno dei Sigg. X (1980)
 Desiderio (1983)
 L'addio a Enrico Berlinguer (1984)
 The Night and the Moment (1995)
 Marcello Mastroianni: mi ricordo, sì, io mi ricordo (1997)

References

External links

1940 births
2022 deaths
Italian women film directors
People from Barletta